Menglie is a town in Jiangcheng Hani and Yi Autonomous County, Yunnan, China. It is the political, economic and cultural center of Jiangcheng Hani and Yi Autonomous County.

Etymology
"Menglie" is a Dai place name, which means plain by a river. "Meng" means plain and "Lie" means river.

Administrative division
As of 2016, the town is divided into two communities and seven villages: 
 Dongcheng Community
 Xicheng Community
 Hongjiang
 Daxin
 Duoba
 Jiangbian
 Qiaotou
 Dazhai
 Niuluohe

History
In 1902, the region came under the jurisdiction of Menglie Suppress Committee.

The town was formed in February 1983. In December 2005, Hongjiang Township was merged into Menglie Town.

Geography
It lies at the southeastern of Jiangcheng Hani and Yi Autonomous County, bordering Kangping Town to the west, Laos to the south, Guoqing Township and Baozang Town to the north, and Qushui Town to the east.

Flood in summer and drought in winter and spring.

The Mengye River, Niuluo River, Menglie River, Dazhai River, Wuma River and Lahu River flow through the town.

The Menglie Reservoir is a reservoir located in the town.

Economy
The economy is supported primarily by farming and ranching. Tea, sugarcane, peanut, vegetable, fruit are the economic plants of this region. The region abounds with coal, iron, copper, Lead, zinc, rock salt, and plaster stone.

Demographics

As of 2017, the National Bureau of Statistics of China estimates the town's population now to be 32,032.

Tourist attractions
The town boasts many cultural and historical relics, including the Menglie Lake Wetland Park, Jiangcheng Hani and Yi Autonomous County Martyrs Memorial Park, Jiangcheng Old Street, Zhenjiang Tower, and the Temple of Mountain Deity

Transportation
The National Highway G219 passes across the town north to south.

References

Bibliography

Divisions of Jiangcheng Hani and Yi Autonomous County